Hubert C. Kueter (born 1930) is the author of My Tainted Blood, which chronicles his childhood in World War II era Germany
. He is also a professor emeritus at Colby College.

My Tainted Blood has been described as being written in the style of magic realism. It follows the author's adventures and exploits as a boy and teenager in wartime Breslau and postwar Germany. The incorporation of the author's love of food and cooking is also a notable feature of this work.

Kueter taught German language and literature at Colby College from 1965 to 1997. From 1975 to 2003 he was also the owner/manager/chef of the Johann Sebastian B Restaurant in Oakland, Maine.

Bibliography
 Kueter, Hubert C. My Tainted Blood, Polar Bear & Company, 2008: .

References 

1930 births
Colby College faculty
Living people
German male writers
People from Oakland, Maine